Hans Paul Franz T. Thiele is a Filipino professional basketball player who last played for the Zamboanga Family's Brand Sardines of the Maharlika Pilipinas Basketball League (MPBL).

Professional career
Thiele was signed by the Barako Bull Energy Boosters in 2010 as a free agent after going undrafted. He was then traded to the Meralco Bolts for Dennis Daa.

Before the 2011 PBA Commissioner's Cup, he and Paolo Bugia were traded to the Alaska Aces for Reynel Hugnatan.

In August 2012, Thiele was traded to the Petron Blaze Boosters in a five-team trade.

In early 2013, Thiele was sent down by Petron Blaze to the San Miguel Beermen of the ASEAN Basketball League for the 2013 ABL season.

After the 2013 ABL season, he was signed by GlobalPort Batang Pier.

On November 4, 2013, Thiele was traded with Willie Miller to the Barako Bull Energy for Enrico Villanueva.

In 2014, Thiele was released by Barako Bull to the 2014 PBA Expansion Draft, where he was picked sixth by Kia Sorento.

In November 2014, Thiele was released by Kia. However, he was signed again by the team a couple of weeks after being released. In the end of the 2014–15 PBA season, he was released again by the team.

PBA career statistics

Correct as of September 27, 2015

Season-by-season averages

|-
| align=left | 
| align=left | Barako Bull / Alaska Aces
| 21 || 19.2 || .473 || .000 || .438 || 5.2 || .7 || .2 || .4 || 5.7
|-
| align=left | 
| align=left | Alaska
| 3 || 3.7 || .000 || .000 || .000 || 1.3 || .0 || .0 || .0 || .0
|-
| align=left | 
| align=left | GlobalPort
| 3 || 4.3 || .333 || .000 || 1.000 || .7 || .0 || .3 || .3 || 1.3
|-
| align=left | 
| align=left | Barako Bull
| 8 || 8.5 || .588 || .000 || .800 || 1.3 || .3 || .1 || .0 || 3.0
|-
| align=left | 
| align=left | Kia
| 26 || 14.0 || .367 || .235 || .595 || 3.6 || .4 || .2 || .3 || 4.6
|-
| align=left | Career
| align=left |
| 61 || 14.1 || .425 || .211 || .553 || 3.6 || .4 || .2 || .3 || 4.4

References

1984 births
Living people
Alaska Aces (PBA) players
Barako Bull Energy players
Barako Bull Energy Boosters players
Basketball players from Aklan
Centers (basketball)
Filipino men's basketball players
Filipino people of Nigerian descent
NorthPort Batang Pier players
Terrafirma Dyip players
Meralco Bolts players
Power forwards (basketball)
San Miguel Alab Pilipinas players
UE Red Warriors basketball players
Maharlika Pilipinas Basketball League players